Mojtaba Bakhshipour, (Mojtaba Bakhshi-Pour) is an Iranian Principlist representative of Iran's Islamic Consultative Assembly in the city of Eslamabad-e Gharb (and Dalahoun) from Kermanshah province who was elected at the second period of the parliament elections on 12 September 2020 with 31,022 votes from 56,646 votes.

Mojtaba Bakhshi-pour was likewise elected as the head of the directors-board of the construction companies of the country (Iran). This member of the "Islamic Consultative Assembly" who is also an entrepreneur/private sector activist, previously served as the deputy chairman of the mentioned construction-companies for 3 years.

See also 

 Islamic Consultative Assembly
 Abdolreza Mesri
 Ebrahim Azizi

References 

Members of the 11th Islamic Consultative Assembly
Iranian politicians
Living people
People from Kermanshah
Islamic Consultative Assembly
Year of birth missing (living people)